Oscar Marion Graham (July 20, 1878 – October 15, 1931) was a professional baseball pitcher. In a 17-year career, he won four games in Major League Baseball and 272 games in the minor leagues. Graham was 6 feet tall and weighed 180 pounds.

Professional career
Graham was born in Plattsmouth, Nebraska in 1878. He started his professional baseball career in 1901. In 1902, he won 16 games in the class A Western League. Graham then went to the Pacific Coast League's Oakland Oaks, and he put up some big numbers in the long PCL seasons. In 1903, he went 28-29 with a 3.44 earned run average, pitching 504.2 innings in 61 games. He led the league in games pitched, innings pitched, losses, and earned runs (193). His 234 walks and 49 hit batters during that season are PCL records that have never been broken. Graham was also a good hitter, as he had a batting average of .323 to finish sixth in the league in that category.

In 1904, Graham had a slightly lesser workload, as he pitched 392.1 innings and went 19-23 with a 2.89 ERA. Again, he hit well and finished ninth in the batting race at .305. Graham had one of his better seasons in 1905. He pitched over 500 innings for the second time and tied his career-high in wins with 28. His ERA dropped to 2.37, and he led the league with 56 games started. The following year, he tossed another 432 innings for Oakland and went 25-23. He was purchased by the American League's Washington Senators in August of that year.

Graham made his major league debut with the Senators on April 16, 1907. He ended up appearing in 20 games for them, including 14 starts, and he went 4-9 with a 3.98 ERA. His last MLB game was on August 5, and he then finished the season with the American Association's Minneapolis Millers.

Graham started 1908 with Minneapolis. He had a win–loss record of 8-5 before leaving to play for another team in Virginia, Minnesota, where he was paid a "whopping" $350 each month. Graham returned to the American Association in 1909, this time with the Indianapolis Indians. In 40 games, he went 15-15. He started off 1910 with them, as well, but was released in July for "failure to keep in winning condition."

For the next few years, Graham bounced around the minor leagues. He had his fifth, and final, 20-win season in 1916, when he went 23-12 with a 2.31 ERA in the Illinois–Indiana–Iowa League. He tied for the league-lead in victories.

After retirement
Graham retired from professional baseball after the 1917 season. He pitched a total of 17 years and won 276 games – 272 in the minor leagues and 4 in the major leagues.

Graham lived in Rising Sun, Iowa, in the winters, and he worked as a corn husker and rabbit hunter during that time. He died in Moline, Illinois, in 1931.

Death
Graham died on October 15, 1931 in Moline, Illinois. He is interred at Riverside Cemetery in Moline.

References

External links

Baseball Almanac

1878 births
1931 deaths
People from Moline, Illinois
People from Plattsmouth, Nebraska
Major League Baseball pitchers
Washington Senators (1901–1960) players
Omaha Omahogs players
Rock Island Islanders players
Oakland Clamdiggers players
Omaha Indians players
Oakland Oaks (baseball) players
San Jose (minor league baseball) players
Minneapolis Millers (baseball) players
Indianapolis Indians players
Milwaukee Brewers (minor league) players
Wheeling Stogies players
Battle Creek Crickets players
Evansville River Rats players
Terre Haute Terre-iers players
Moline Plowboys players
Joplin Miners players
Baseball players from Nebraska